The following is a timeline of the history of the city of Bremen, Germany.

Prior to 19th century

 787 CE - Catholic diocese of Bremen formed.
 848 CE - Transfer of the archiepiscopal see of Hamburg to Bremen.
 965 CE - Adaldag archbishop of Hamburg-Bremen given ruling powers by Otto I, Holy Roman Emperor
 1186 - Frederick I, Holy Roman Emperor grants privilegium to the townspeople.
 1220's - Bremen Cathedral construction began.
 1223 – Archbishopric relocated to Bremen from Hamburg.
 1230 – Church of Our Lady rebuilt (approximate date).
 1243 – St. Ansgarius church built (approximate date).
 1247 - Location of  Schlachte  settled by local citizens and traders.
 1283 - Bremen admitted to the Hanseatic League but was excluded in 1285.
 1304 - "The commonalty rose against the patricians and drove them from the city."
 1358 - Bremen re-admitted to the Hanseatic League.
 1409 – Town Hall built.
 1427 – Bremen re-excluded from the Hanseatic League.
 1433 – Bremen re-admitted to the Hanseatic League.
 1522 - The Reformation was introduced into Bremen.
 1532 - Bremen joins the Schmalkaldic League.
 1588 – Stadtwaage built.
 1618 - Protestantism definitively proclaimed as the state religion.
 1619 – Cloth-traders' guild hall built.
 1630
 Lübeck-Hamburg-Bremen defensive alliance formed.
 Shipper's House built.
 1644 - Frederick II of Denmark deposed by the Swedes.
 1654 & 1666 - Swedish Wars on Bremen.
 1675 – Bremen-Verden Campaign.
 1682 - Bremen Exchange construction began of a single story building.
 1720 - George I., elector of Hanover recognized Bremen as a free city. 
 1790 - City directory published.
 1792 –  (theatre) built.

19th century
 1807 - Population: 36,041.
 1806 - Bremen taken by the French.
 1810 – Bremen becomes part of the French Empire.
 1815 - Congress of Vienna restores its independence.
 1823
 Art Society founded.
 St. John's Church rededicated as a Catholic church 
 1827 – Bremerhaven (seaport) established.
 1847
 Bremen Hauptbahnhof (main railway station) opens.
 Wunstorf–Bremen railway opens.
 1849 – Kunsthalle (art museum) built.
 1857 – Norddeutscher Lloyd shipping company in business.
 1862 - Population: 67,217.
 1866 – Bremen joins the North German Confederation.
 1867
 Exchange built.
 Oldenburg–Bremen railway opened.
 Population: 74,574.
 1868 – 10 April: Premiere of Brahm's German Requiem.
 1871
 End of Bremen independence, city becomes part of the German Empire.
 Population: 82,969.
 1872 – AG Weser in business.
 1874 – Agricultural exhibition held.
 1875
 Kaiserbrucke (bridge) built.
 Population: 102,499.
 1876 – Horse tramway begins operating.
 1878 – Post office built.
 1885 - Population: 118,395.
 1888
 Bremen joins German Customs Union.
 Bremen Hauptbahnhof (train station) re-built.
 1890
 Bremer Straßenbahn active.
 Population: 124,955.
 1892 – Electric tramway begins operating.
 1893 – Bremer Vulkan shipbuilder in business.
 1895 – Law courts built.
 1900 – Population: 186,822; state 248,407.

20th century

1900-1945
 1901 – Bremen Cathedral great restoration completed.
 1902 – Kunsthalle (art museum) enlarged.
 1905 – Population: 214,953; state 263,673.
 1906 – Production of decaffeinated Kaffee Hag coffee begins.
 1911 – Rathscafé built.
 1913
 Bremen Airport established.
 New Town Hall and Theater am Goetheplatz built.
 20 June: Bremen school shooting.
 1919 – Population: 257,923.
 1920 – New constitution put into effect.
 1923 – Bremer Flugzeugbau aircraft manufactory in business.
 1925 – Fahrzeugwerke Borgward automobile manufactory in business.
 1928 – Population: 302,949.
 1932 –  (monument) unveiled.
 1933
 March: Nazis take control of executive Senate.
 October: Bürgerschaft (state parliament) is dissolved.
 1939
 Aumund, Blumenthal, Fähr, Farge, Grohn, Hammersbeck, Lobbendorf, Schönebeck, and Vegesack become part of city.
 August: Polish libraries seized by the Gestapo.
 September: Mass arrests of local Polish activists (see also Nazi crimes against the Polish nation).
 Population: 431,800.
 1940
 May: Bombing of Bremen in World War II begins.
 May: Bremen-Blumenthal forced labour camp for men established.
 1942 – 2nd SS construction brigade (forced labour camp) established by the SS.
 1943 – Bremen-Farge subcamp of the Neuengamme concentration camp established. The prisoners were mostly French, Polish and Soviet men.
 1944
 15 April: 2nd SS construction brigade relocated to Berlin.
 2 August: Bremen-Hindenburgkaserne subcamp of Neuengamme established. Its prisoners were Jewish women.
 16 August: Bremen-Neuenland subcamp of Neuengamme established. Its prisoners were mostly French and Soviet men.
 August: Bremen-Blumenthal subcamp of Neuengamme established. Its prisoners were mostly Belgian, French, Polish, Soviet and Jewish men.
 26 September: Bremen-Hindenburgkaserne subcamp of Neuengamme dissolved and Bremen-Obernheide subcamp established. Prisoners moved from Hindenburgkaserne to Obernheide.
 28 November: Bremen-Neuenland subcamp of Neuengamme dissolved and Bremen-Osterort subcamp established. Prisoners moved from Neuenland to Osterort.
 25/26 December: Bremen-Schützenhof subcamp of Neuengamme established. Its prisoners were mostly Jewish men.

 1945
 4 April: Bremen-Obernheide subcamp of Neuengamme dissolved. Prisoners sent on a death march to Uesen.
 6 April: Bremen-Osterort subcamp of Neuengamme dissolved. Prisoners moved to the Bremen-Farge subcamp.
 7–9 April: Blumenthal and Schützenhof subcamps of Neuengamme dissolved. Prisoners moved to the Bremen-Farge subcamp.
 10 April: Bremen-Farge subcamp of Neuengamme dissolved. Prisoners either sent on death marches to Bremervörde and Sandbostel or deported by train towards the Bergen-Belsen concentration camp.
 22 April: Bombing of Bremen in World War II ends.
 April: City captured by British forces.
 Wilhelm Kaisen becomes mayor.

1946-1990s
 1947 – State of Bremen reestablished.
 1949 – Becomes a constituent state of West Germany.
 1956 – Population: 507,952.
 1964 – Bremen-Arena opens.
 1966
 28 January: Airplane crash.
 Bürgerschaft (parliament) building and  open.
 1983 – Bremer Shakespeare Company founded.
 1986 – Bremen TV tower erected.
 1990 – Population: 551,219.
 1992 – Deutsche Kammerphilharmonie Bremen active.
 1999
 6 June: Bremen state election, 1999 held.
  built.

21st century

 2003
 City hosts the 2003 European Karate Championships.
 25 May: Bremen state election, 2003 held.
 2005 – Jens Böhrnsen becomes mayor.
 2007 – 13 May: Bremen state election, 2007 held.
 2010 – Bremen S-Bahn begins operating.
 2011 – 22 May: Bremen state election, 2011 held.
 2012 – Population: 547,976.
 2014 – City hosts the 2014 World Karate Championships.
 2015 - 10 May: 2015 Bremen state election
 2015 - 17 July: Carsten Sieling becomes mayor.
 2019 - 26 May: 2019 Bremen state election
 2019 - 15 August: Andreas Bovenschulte becomes mayor.

See also
 History of Bremen
 List of mayors of Bremen

References

This article incorporates information from the German Wikipedia.

Bibliography

in English

in German

External links
 Europeana. Items related to Bremen, various dates

Bremen-related lists
 
 
Bremen
Years in Bremen